Weiss or Weiß, also written Weis or Weisz, pronounced like "vice", is a German and Ashkenazi Jewish surname, meaning 'white' in both German and Yiddish. It comes from Middle High German  wîz (white, blonde) and Old High German  (h)wīz (white, bright, shining).

Persons with that name include:

A
 Al Weiss, (born 1954), president of worldwide operations for Walt Disney Parks and Resorts
 Andrew Weiss (disambiguation), multiple people
 Anthony S. Weiss (fl. 1998), McCaughey Chair and Professor of Biochemistry and Molecular Biotechnology at the University of Sydney, Australia
 Armin Weiss (1927–2010), German chemist and politician
 Arnold Weiss (1924–2010), German-born refugee from Nazi Germany who emigrated to the United States where he became an intelligence officer 
 Avi Weiss (fl. 1968), an American Modern Orthodox rabbi who heads the Hebrew Institute of Riverdale

B

 Bari Weiss (born 1984), American opinion writer and editor
 Bernhard Weiss (1827–1918), German Biblical scholar
 Bianca Weiß (born 1968), German field hockey player
 Bill Weiss (1925–2011), American baseball historian and statistician
 Birte Weiss (born 1941), Danish journalist and politician
 Bob Weiss (born 1942), American basketball player and coach
 Brian Weiss (born 1944), American psychiatrist and hypnotherapist

C
 Carl Weiss (1906–1935), murderer of Huey Long
 Carl W. Weiss (1915–1942), United States marine during World War II
 Carol Weiss King (1895–1952), attorney, founder of the International Juridical Association
 Christian Samuel Weiss (1780–1856), German mineralogist
 Chuck E. Weiss (fl. 1970s), American songwriter and vocalist
 Clemens Weiss (born 1955), German artist

D
 D. B. Weiss (born 1971), American television producer, writer, and novelist
 Daniel Weiss (disambiguation), multiple people
 David Weiss (disambiguation), multiple people

E
 Edith Weiss-Mann (1885-1951) German musicologist and harpsichordist
 Edmund Weiss (1837–1917), Austrian astronomer
 Emanuel Weiss (1906–1944), New York organized crime figure, executed for murder
 Enoch R. Weiss (1848–1917), American military soldier
 Eric Weiss, fictional character, introduced in 2001 on the television series Alias
 Ernst August Weiß (1900–1942), German mathematician
 Ehrich Weiss, real name of Harry Houdini (1874–1926), Hungarian-American illusionist and stunt performer

F
 Florence Weiss, Russian-Born Yiddish theatre actor and soprano
 Frank E. Weiss (born 1951), American collegiate basketball player and Army officer
 Franz Weiss (violist) (1778–1830), Austrian viola player
Frederick Ernest Weiss (1865-1953), Botanist

G 
 Gaia Weiss (born 1991), French model and actress
 Gary Weiss (fl. 1984), American investigative journalist
 George Weiss (baseball) (1894–1972), American baseball executive
 George Weiss (producer) (fl. 1954–1995), American film producer
 George David Weiss (1921–2010), American songwriter, president Songwriters Guild of America
 George Henry Weiss (1898–1946), American poet, writer and novelist
 Guido Weiss (1928–2021), Italian-born American mathematician

H
 Hans Weiss (aviator) (1892–1918), German flying ace
 Harald Weiss (born 1949), German composer
 Harry Weiss (philatelist) (1888–1966), American philatelist
 Hartmut Weiß (born 1942), German footballer
 Harvey Weiss (fl. 1966), American archaeologist and professor
 Heinz Weiss (1921–2010), German film actor
 Helen L. Weiss (1920-1948) American composer, pianist and choir director
 Herm Weiss (1916–1976), American basketball player
 Hermann Weiss (1909–??), Austrian Olympic ice hockey player
 Hymie Weiss (1898–1926), American mobster in the 1920s

I
 Isaac Hirsch Weiss (1815–1905), Austrian talmudist

J
 Jack Weiss (born 1964), American entrepreneur and politician
 Jacob Weiss (1750–1839), American Revolutionary War officer
 Jan Weiss (1892–1972), Czech writer
 Janet Weiss (born 1965), American rock drummer
 Jennifer Weiss (politician) (born 1959), American politician 
 Jerry Weiss (musician) (born 1946), American musician and member of Blood, Sweat & Tears
 Jim Weiss (born 1948), American children's audio storyteller and author
 Johannes Weiss (1863–1914), German theologian
 John Weiss (1818–1879), American clergyman, author, abolitionist and women's rights advocate
 John-Allison Weiss (born 1987), New York-based indie-pop singer-songwriter
 Johnny Weiss (born 1963), known as Johnny Hotbody, American professional wrestler
 Joseph Weiß (1486/87–1565), from German Renaissance family of painters, son of Marx Weiß the Elder, brother of Marx Weiß the Younger
 Joseph G. Weiss (1918-1969), British scholar of Jewish Mysticism and Hasidism, director of the Institute of Jewish Studies at University College London
 Joseph Hirsch Weiss (1800–1881), Hungarian rabbi
 Joseph Joshua Weiss (1905–1972), Austrian chemist and professor, co-discoverer of Haber–Weiss reaction
 Josephine Weiss (1805–1852), Austrian ballet dancer and dance troupe leader
 Juleanna Glover, formerly Glover–Weiss (born 1969), American public affairs consultant, lobbyist, political strategist
 Julie Weiss (fl. 1975), American film and stage costume designer

L
 Lee Weiss (1928–2018), American painter
 Leopold Weiss, birth name of Muhammad Asad (1900–1992), Austro-Hungarian journalist, political theorist, diplomat and Islamic scholar
 Linda Weiss (fl. 1988), Australian professor of political science
 Louis S. Weiss (1894–1950), American lawyer
 Louise Weiss (1893–1983), French author, journalist, feminist and politician
 Luigi Weiss (born 1951), Italian ski mountaineer and biathlete

M
 Maria Weiss (singer) (fl. 2003), Austrian baroque and opera singer
 Markus Nissa Weiss (fl. 1792), Hungarian advocate and author of Jewish Reform movement
 Martin Weiss (disambiguation), multiple people
 Marx Weiß ( – 1580), from German Renaissance family of painters, son of Marx Weiß the Elder, brother of Joseph Weiß
 Mary Weiss (born 1948), American pop music vocalist, lead singer of The Shangri-Las
 Mary Terán de Weiss (1918–1984), Argentine tennis player
 Max Weiss (1857–1927), Austrian chess player
 Max Weiss (activist) (fl. 1926–1956), American author and executive in the Communist Party USA
 Melvyn Weiss (1935–2018), American attorney
 Michael Weiss (disambiguation), multiple people
 Mitch Weiss (born 1957), American investigative journalist, Pulitzer Prize winner
 Mitch Weiss (photographer) (born 1986), American photographer
 Morris Weiss (1915–2014), American comic book and comic strip artist and writer
 Myra Tanner Weiss (1917–1997), American Trotskyite communist, three time U.S. Vice-Presidential candidate

N
 Nathan Weiss (1851–1883), Austrian physicist and neurologist
 Nigel Weiss (1936–2020), South African astronomer and mathematician
 Norman Weiss (fl. 1940s–??), American talent agent for The Turtles and Tom Jones, arranged The Beatles first American tour

P
 Paul Weiss (disambiguation), multiple people
 Pernille Weiss (born 1968), Danish politician
 Peter Weiss, (1916–1982), German-Swedish writer and artist
 Pierre Weiss (1865–1940), French physicist

R
 Rachel Weisz (born 1970), British-American actress
 Rainbow George Weiss (born 1940), British politician
 Rainer Weiss (born 1932), German-American Nobel Prize laureate in Physics
 Regina Weiss, American politician
 Robert Weiss (disambiguation), multiple people
 Ruth Weiss (disambiguation), multiple people
 Ryan Weiss, American baseball player

S
 Sabine Weiss (disambiguation), multiple people
 Samuel Weiss (disambiguation), multiple people
 Shaun Weiss (born 1978), American actor and recidivist criminal offender
 Shevah Weiss (born 1935), Israeli politician
 Sholam Weiss (born 1954), American businessman and felon sentenced to 845 years in prison
 Soma Weiss (1898–1942), Hungarian-American physician
 Stephen Weiss (born 1983), Canadian ice hockey player
 Susan Archer Weiss (1822–1917), American poet, author and artist
 Sylvius Leopold Weiss (1687–1750), German composer and lutenist

T
 Trude Weiss-Rosmarin (1908–1989), German-American writer, scholar and feminist activist

V
Vladimír Weiss (footballer, born 1939) (1939–2018), Slovak-born Czechoslovak footballer and Slovak football coach
Vladimír Weiss (footballer, born 1964), his son, Czechoslovak, then Slovak, footballer and football coach
Vladimír Weiss (footballer, born 1989), his grandson, Czechoslovakia born, Slovak footballer
note that Slovakia was part of Czechoslovakia from 1945 to 1992

W
 Walt Weiss (born 1963), American baseball player and manager
 Walter Weiß (1890–1967), Nazi German general
 Wilhelm Weiss (1892–1950), German senior Nazi Party member and editor of its newspaper
 Wincent Weiss (born 1993), German singer and talent show contestant
 Wojciech Weiss (1875–1950), Polish artist

Y
Yisroel Dovid Weiss (born 1956), American rabbi
Yitzchok Yaakov Weiss (1902–1989), Austro-Hungarian-born British rabbi, halachic authority and Talmudic scholar

Z

 Zack Weiss (born 1992), American baseball player

References

German-language surnames
Jewish surnames
Surnames from nicknames